Love Without Fear may refer to:

 Love Without Fear (album), an album by Dan Wilson
 Love Without Fear (film), a 1989 East German public-education documentary film